Rio, 100 Degrees F. (Portuguese: Rio, 40 Graus) is a 1955 Brazilian film written and directed by Nelson Pereira dos Santos. It is dos Santos' first feature work, inspired by the Italian Neo-Realism, and is considered a precursor of the Cinema Novo movement.

Synopsis 
One Sunday, five boys from the favela go to different parts of the city to sell peanuts. Zeca, Sujinho, Jorge, Paulinho and Xerife interconnect the focused stories, covering five touristic points: Copacabana, Sugar Loaf Mountain, Corcovado, Quinta da Boa Vista and Maracanã Stadium. In addition to trying to make a living, they decide to accumulate money to buy a soccer ball. Jorge also needs to sell enough to buy medicine for his sick mother. He goes to Copacabana, is bumped into and his can of peanuts falls into the sea. Without the goods to sell, Jorge starts begging and gets money, but other boys try to rob him, and when he gets rid of them, he is run over. Paulinho goes to Quinta da Boa Vista and his lizard, Catarina, escapes to the zoo. He retrieves it, but the guard of the place chases him away and throws his pet into a serpentarium. Resigned, Paulinho leaves for Maracanã, where he meets the rogue Miro [Jece Valadão (1930-2006)] and his partner Zé [Zé Kéti (1921-1999)] who, eager to enter the stadium and watch the game, take the whole boy's money and sell the remaining peanuts. Zeca, in turn, decides to go to Corcovado, but he is noticed by the explorer of minors who works there, an unscrupulous old man who chases him, forcing him to make a risky escape. Sujinho, on the other hand, with no money and no peanuts, is escorted to his house by a policeman. Sheriff does well in sales and manages to enter Maracanã, after circumventing security. He and Zeca end the day happy to have gotten the money.

Minor characters and other stories are told in parallel. The one that highlights the contrast in the careers of two players, Foguinho's revelation for football and Daniel's decadence. There is also the pregnancy of a migrant from the Northeast, whose boyfriend hesitates to make a commitment, and the arrival of a colonel from the interior to visit Corcovado.

Cast 
 Roberto Batalin .... Pedro
 Glauce Rocha .... Rosa
 Jece Valadão .... Miro
 Ana Beatriz .... Maria Helena
 Modesto de Souza .... landowner
 Cláudia Morena .... Alice
 Ivone Miranda
 Antônio Novais
 Jackson de Souza
 Sady Cabral
 Mauro Mendonça .... Italian tourist at the Sugarloaf Mountain

References

External links 
 

Films set in Rio de Janeiro (city)
Brazilian drama films
Films directed by Nelson Pereira dos Santos
1950s Portuguese-language films
Brazilian black-and-white films
Films shot in Rio de Janeiro (city)
1955 films
1955 drama films